Back by Blockular Demand: Serve & Collect II is the third studio album by American hip hop group Boss Hogg Outlawz. It was released on September 2, 2008, via Boss Hogg Outlawz/Koch Records. The album served as a sequel to the previous years Serve & Collect.

Serve & Collect II became the group's most successful album chart-wise, peaking at number 47 on the Billboard 200 while also reaching the top 10 of R&B, rap and independent charts. This album was followed by Serve & Collect III, though founding members Chris Ward and Killa Kyleon had left the group and did not participate in the recording of the album.

Track listing

Sample credits
"Living Without" contains elements from "The Picture Will Never Change" by Lamont Dozier 
"Give Me Some" contains elements from "Hospital Prelude of Love Theme" by Willie Hutch

Personnel
Stayve Jerome Thomas – performer (tracks: 1–4, 6, 9–11, 14–16), executive producer
Kyle Jeroderrick Riley – performer (tracks: 1–4, 6–7, 9–11, 14)
Perthy Carson – performer (tracks: 1–2, 6, 9–10, 13–16)
S. Witfield – performer (tracks: 1, 3, 6, 8, 14–16)
Chris Ward – performer (tracks: 1, 4, 10–12, 14)
Larry Wayne Jones, Jr. – performer (tracks: 1, 5–6, 15–16)
T. Harris – performer (track 6)
Marcus Edwards – performer (track 5)
William Raymond Norwood, Jr. – performer (track 9)
Leroy Williams, Jr. – producer & mixing (tracks: 2–5, 7, 9–12, 14–16)
GL Productions – producer (tracks: 1, 16)
DSF – producer (tracks: 8, 13)
Terry Keith Allen – producer (track 6)
Sammy Huen – mixing (tracks: 1, 8, 13, 16)
Raymond Thomas – executive producer
Mike Frost – artwork & photography

Chart history

References

External links

2008 albums
Sequel albums
E1 Music albums
Slim Thug albums
Boss Hogg Outlawz albums